Richwoods may refer to:

Places
Richwoods, Illinois, an unincorporated community
Richwoods, Missouri, an unincorporated community
Richwoods Township (disambiguation), several places

Other
Richwoods High School (in Peoria, Illinois)

See also
 Richwood (disambiguation)